Sublime with Rome is a musical collaboration between Eric Wilson, formerly of the American ska punk band Sublime, and singer and guitarist Rome Ramirez. The group's name is not only a reference to the singer's first name, but to the fact that they chiefly perform songs by the original Sublime, which was fronted by Bradley Nowell until his death in 1996.

Ramirez began performing with Bud Gaugh (also formerly of Sublime) and Wilson in 2009, where they played under the name "Sublime", until Nowell's estate issued a legal challenge to the use of the trademarked name for a venture not including Nowell. As a result, they changed their name to "Sublime with Rome" in January 2010. The group played at the 2009 Smokeout Festival and embarked on their first tour in 2010, before releasing their debut album, Yours Truly, on July 12, 2011. Gaugh left the band on December 10, 2011, and was replaced by Josh Freese. The lineup of Wilson, Ramirez and Freese recorded the group's second album Sirens, which was released in 2015. Sublime with Rome's third lineup change took place in 2017, when Carlos Verdugo replaced Freese.

In May 2019, the new trio released their first album together, and the third for Sublime With Rome, titled Blessings. The album, produced by Rob Cavallo, features the song "Wicked Heart" as the album's first single, reaching No. 34 on Billboards Alternative Songs chart.

History
Pre-Sublime with Rome days (1997–2009)
In 1997 Bud Gaugh and Eric Wilson started Long Beach Dub Allstars, their first project since Bradley Nowell's death. The band played Sublime songs as well as new material.  After Long Beach Dub Allstars split up in 2002, Wilson went on to form Long Beach Shortbus, while Gaugh went on to form Eyes Adrift and Volcano (which both featured Meat Puppets guitarist/vocalist Curt Kirkwood).

In February 2009 Gaugh and Wilson reunited for a show in Nevada and called themselves Sublime. They were joined by a new singer-guitarist whose identity was not announced; on March 1, 2009, Gaugh confirmed this was then-20-year-old Northern California native Rome Ramirez, who had previously collaborated with Wilson on RAWsession where he played Sublime songs such as "Saw Red" and "Boss DJ". The trio played another show at Cypress Hill's Smokeout Festival on October 24, 2009 in San Bernardino, California. The festival also featured performances from Kottonmouth Kings, Slipknot, Deftones, Bad Brains and Pennywise.

Lawsuit (2009–2010)
On October 23, 2009, one day before the Smokeout Festival concert took place, Nowell's family and the executors of his estate threatened Gaugh and Wilson, along with Ramirez, with a lawsuit if the reconstituted band continued to use the Sublime moniker. The statement was posted to the band's official MySpace page and read as follows:

On November 3, 2009, a Los Angeles judge shut down an effort by the new lineup of Sublime to perform under the name. Jeremiah Reynolds, who represents the estate of original Sublime singer Bradley Nowell commented on the case:

As part of the preliminary injunction, the new lineup are said to be unable to perform or record under the name Sublime without approval and permission from the Nowell estate. A spokesman for Gaugh and Wilson declined to comment. Thomas Brackey, who represents the surviving Sublime members, did not return calls. The injunction is dependent upon a bond of $125,000 being posted in the event it is later determined that the defendants – the surviving Sublime members – suffered damages as a result of the ruling. Reynolds said the bond would be posted. Gaugh and Wilson issued the following statement:

In January 2010, the case was dismissed and it was finally announced that the new lineup of Ramirez, Wilson and Gaugh would perform together under Sublime with Rome.

Subsequent touring and Yours Truly (2010–2011)
Asked in October 2009 about the future of the project, Gaugh replied:

In February 2010, the band confirmed numerous North American dates, as well as plans to tour Europe in May. However, as of June 2010, a European tour in May never came to fruition. Sublime with Rome live shows include Todd Forman on sax and keyboards; Forman was the original sax player on past Sublime studio albums.

Gaugh told Billboard.com that new material from Sublime with Rome was in the cards. The trio wrote three new songs when it first started playing together in February 2009, including one, "Panic", that was performed at all three shows they had done so far. He explained, "We're gonna continue working on material as we're on the road. It's not without question to have a studio in one of the buses while we're on tour. We do a lot of our best creativity on stage, so we'll be trying out new stuff for the fans, even before we go into the studio."

In May 2010, Gaugh revealed to Billboard.com that Sublime with Rome would enter the studio in June for a week "and nail down some of the more worked-out songs, and possibly even finish one or two of them for a late summer radio release". The band was expected to have the album out in 2011. On February 5, 2011, Sublime with Rome announced on their official website that they were planning to enter the studio in March to begin recording their debut album, with Butthole Surfers guitarist Paul Leary producing. Ramirez had said several collaborations were being considered. "There will be special guests and some collaborations as well, like one with Aimee Allen."

On February 21, 2011, the band posted a statement on their Facebook page saying that they had begun recording the album and would be posting "mad videos" to "let everyone know where to go for a behind the scenes look at the Sublime with Rome process." On April 14, 2011, Ramirez posted an update on Sublime with Rome's official website saying that the album was almost finished and projected a summer release. During the summer 2010 tour, Sublime with Rome performed their first new song "Panic" on Jimmy Kimmel Live!. It was also announced that Sublime with Rome officially signed to record label Fueled by Ramen and released their debut album Yours Truly on July 12, 2011.

Gaugh's departure and Sirens (2011–2016)
On December 10, 2011, at the KROQ Almost Acoustic Christmas, the band announced that it would be the last performance with drummer Bud Gaugh, who would be leaving the group to spend more time with his family as he was expecting a child. Josh Freese filled in for some performances on a temporary basis, before officially joining the band. On January 12, 2012, in an interview posted on budztv.com, Gaugh expressed regrets about touring and recording with Sublime with Rome stating:

When asked if he saw the band reuniting in the future Gaugh replied, "No, I am done with SWR. I would be into playing music with Eric Wilson, however."
When asked how it felt to play Sublime songs again, Gaugh said, "It was really good for the first few months, after that, it just felt wrong. Not playing the songs but playing them with the name Sublime, without Brad."

Despite this, Sublime with Rome continued to tour, with Josh Freese taking Gaugh's place.

By 2013, Sublime with Rome was expected to return to the studio to record their second album. On May 13, 2015, the first single from then-upcoming album Sirens, titled "Wherever You Go", was released on YouTube. A second single was released on YouTube and iTunes, titled "Sirens (Feat. The Dirty Heads)", on June 29, 2015. Sirens was released on July 17, 2015.

Freese's departure, tour with The Offspring, and Blessings (2017–present)
In early 2017, Josh Freese was replaced by former Tribal Seeds drummer Carlos Verdugo. Soon after, the band announced a North American summer tour with The Offspring and The Menzingers. The band's third album, Blessings was produced by Rob Cavallo and released through Red Music in 2019. 

Ramirez said of the album, "A lot of these songs really came from honestly me being in a spot where I wanted to just write all the lyrics upfront first and focus on what I wanted to say. I just got married, I was having my first child. Things were starting to change for my life; I stopped drinking hard alcohol. Everything was starting to come into focus for this for the next chapter."

MembersCurrent membersRome Ramirez – lead vocals, guitar (2009–present)
Eric Wilson – bass, backing vocals (2009–present)
Carlos Verdugo – drums, percussion (2017–2023)Former members'''
Bud Gaugh – drums, percussion (2009–2011)
Josh Freese – drums, percussion (2011–2017)

Tours
 Sublime with Rome Tour (2010)
 311 Unity Tour (2011)
 Sublime with Rome/Cypress Hill/Pepper Tour (2012)
 Sublime with Rome/Rebelution/Pepper Summer Tour (2015) 
 Sublime with Rome Summer Tour (2016)
 Sublime with Rome/The Offspring Summer Tour (2017)
 SOJA and Sublime With Rome Summer Tour (2019)
Dirty Heads/Sublime with Rome: High and Mighty Tour (2021)
Incubus with Very Special Guest Sublime with Rome and The Aquadolls (2022)

Discography
Studio albums

Singles

Songs

References

Further reading
 Reservoired Dog "Interview with Rome Ramirez of Sublime with Rome", NerdSociety.com'' April 24, 2010.

External links
 
 Rome Starting to Fill Sublime's Shoes
 Sublime Band Reloaded

Musical groups established in 2009
American reggae musical groups
Punk rock groups from California
Alternative rock groups from California
Pop punk groups from California
Musical groups from Los Angeles
Reggae rock groups
Rap rock groups
American musical trios
Sublime (band)
Fueled by Ramen artists